Benzoylacetone is the organic compound with the nominal formula C6H5C(O)CH2C(O)CH3. As a 1,3-dicarbonyl, it is a precursor to many heterocycles, such as pyrazoles.  It exists predominantly as the enol tautomer C6H5C(OH)=CHC(O)CH3.   Its conjugate base (pKa=8.7) forms stable complexes with transition metals and lanthanides.

References

Aromatic ketones
Chelating agents
Ligands
Phenyl compounds